Cacholong, also known as Kalmuck agate, is a form of common opal, although it is often mistaken for agate or chalcedony. A milky white colour with a Mohs hardness of about 6, it is used for carving, cameos, etc.  Found in Austria, Czech Republic, Mongolia and Uzbekistan, its name possibly comes from a river in Uzbekistan.

References

Minerals

Opals